The 1989–90 Buffalo Sabres season was the Sabres' 20th season in the National Hockey League. They finished the season with the third best record in the NHL. The season also featured the NHL debuts of Alexander Mogilny, Rob Ray, and Donald Audette.

Offseason

NHL Draft

Regular season

Season standings

Schedule and results

Player statistics

Forwards
Note: GP = Games played; G = Goals; A = Assists; Pts = Points; PIM = Penalty minutes

Defencemen
Note: GP = Games played; G = Goals; A = Assists; Pts = Points; PIM = Penalty minutes

Goaltending
Note: GP = Games played; W = Wins; L = Losses; T = Ties; SO = Shutouts; GAA = Goals against average

Playoffs
1990 Stanley Cup playoffs

Awards and records
 Daren Puppa, Goaltender, NHL All-Star Game Appearance
 Pierre Turgeon, Phil Housley, Dave Anderchuk, NHL All-Star Game Appearance
 Daren Puppa, Goaltender, NHL Second Team All-Star

References
 Sabres on Hockey Database

Buffalo Sabres seasons
Buffalo
Buffalo
Buffalo
Buffalo